Stem Cells and Development is a biweekly peer-reviewed scientific journal covering cell biology, with a specific focus on biomedical applications of stem cells. It was established in 1992 as the Journal of Hematotherapy, and was renamed the Journal of Hematotherapy & Stem Cell Research in 1999. The journal obtained its current name in 2004. It is published by Mary Ann Liebert, Inc. and the editor-in-chief is Graham C. Parker (Wayne State University School of Medicine). According to the Journal Citation Reports, the journal has a 2018 impact factor of 3.147.

References

External links

Publications established in 1992
Biweekly journals
Stem cell research
Molecular and cellular biology journals
Mary Ann Liebert academic journals
English-language journals